John II (3 March 1455 – 25 October 1495), called the Perfect Prince, was King of Portugal from 1481 until his death in 1495, and also for a brief time in 1477. He is known for re-establishing the power of the Portuguese monarchy, reinvigorating the Portuguese economy, and renewing his country's exploration of Africa and Asia.

Early life
Born in Lisbon, the son of King Afonso V of Portugal by his wife, Isabella of Coimbra, John II succeeded his father as ruler of Portugal in 1477, when the king retired to a monastery, but only became king in 1481, after the death of his father and predecessor.

As a prince, John II accompanied his father in the campaigns in northern Africa and was made a knight after the victory in the Conquest of Arzila in 1471. In 1473, he married Leonor of Viseu, an infanta of Portugal and his first cousin.

Even at a young age, John was not popular among the peers of the kingdom since he was immune to external influence and appeared to despise intrigue. The nobles (including particularly his half second cousin Ferdinand II, the Duke of Braganza) were afraid of his future policies as king.

Consolidation of power

 accession to the throne in 1481, John II took a series of measures to curtail the power of the Portuguese aristocracy and concentrate power in himself. As one example of the measures he took, he deprived the nobles of their right to administer justice on their estates. Immediately, the nobles started to conspire. Letters of complaint and pleas to intervene were exchanged between the Duke of Braganza and Queen Isabella I of Castile.

King John took the precaution of renegotiating the "Tercerias de Moura" agreement to insure that his son Afonso was living safely back at court before he would move against Braganza, the most powerful noble in the realm (the original agreement called for Afonso to live in Moura, Portugal, with his intended Spanish bride, Isabella, Princess of Asturias, as children before their marriage). In 1483, additional correspondence was intercepted by royal spies. The House of Braganza was outlawed, their lands confiscated and the duke executed in Évora. The Duke's widow, Isabella of Viseu, John's cousin and sister-in-law, fled with her children to Castile.

In the following year, the Duke of Viseu, John's cousin and brother-in-law, was summoned to the palace and stabbed to death by the king himself for suspicion of a new conspiracy. Many other people were executed, murdered, or exiled to Castile, including the Bishop of Évora, who was poisoned in prison. Following the crackdown, no one in the country dared to defy the king and John saw no further conspiracies during his reign. A great confiscation of estates followed and enriched the crown, which now became the dominant power of the realm.

Economy
Facing a bankrupt kingdom, John II showed the initiative to solve the situation by creating a regime in which a council of scholars took a vital role. The king conducted a search of the population and selected members for the Council on the basis of their abilities, talents and credentials (meritocracy). John's exploration policies (see below) also paid great dividends. Such was the profit coming from John II's investments in the overseas explorations and expansion that the Portuguese currency had become the soundest in Europe. The kingdom could finally collect taxes for its own use rather than to pay debts, mainly thanks to its main gold source at that time, the coast of Guinea.

Exploration
John II famously restored the policies of Atlantic exploration, reviving the work of his great-uncle, Henry the Navigator. The Portuguese explorations were his main priority in government. Portuguese explorers pushed south along the known coast of Africa with the purpose of discovering the maritime route to India and breaking into the spice trade. During his reign, the following achievements were realised:
 1482 – Foundation of the coastal fortress and trade post of São Jorge da Mina 
 1484 – Discovery of the Congo River by Diogo Cão.
 1488 – Discovery and passage of the Cape of Good Hope by Bartolomeu Dias in Mossel Bay.
 1493 – Start of the settlement of the São Tomé and Príncipe islands by Álvaro Caminha.
 Funding of land expeditions by Afonso de Paiva and Pêro da Covilhã to India and Ethiopia in search of the kingdom of Prester John.

The true extent of Portuguese explorations has been the subject of academic debate. According to one theory, some navigations were kept secret for fear of competition by neighbouring Castile. The archives of this period were mainly destroyed in the fire after the 1755 Lisbon earthquake, and what was not destroyed during the earthquake was either stolen or destroyed during the Peninsular War or otherwise lost.

Conflict with Castile

When Columbus returned from his first voyage early in 1493, he first stopped in Lisbon to claim his victory in front of King John II. King John II's only response to this was that under the Treaty of Alcáçovas previously signed with Spain, Columbus's discoveries lay within Portugal's sphere of influence. Before Columbus even reached Isabella I of Castile, John II had already sent a letter to them threatening to send a fleet to claim it for Portugal. Spain quickly hastened to the negotiating table, which took place in a small Spanish town named Tordesillas with a papal representative present to act as mediator. The result of this meeting would be the famous Treaty of Tordesillas, which sought to divide all newly discovered lands in the New World between Spain and Portugal.

Legacy
John II died at Alvor at age 40 without legitimate children. Despite his attempts to have his illegitimate son Jorge, Duke of Coimbra, succeed him, he was succeeded by his first cousin and brother in-law, Manuel I.

The nickname the Perfect Prince is a posthumous appellation that is intended to refer to Niccolò Machiavelli's work The Prince. John II is considered to have lived his life exactly according to the writer's idea of a perfect prince. Nevertheless, he was admired as one of the greatest European monarchs of his time. Isabella I of Castile usually referred to him as El Hombre (The Man).

The Italian scholar Poliziano wrote a letter to John II that paid him a profound homage:

to render you thanks on behalf of all who belong to this century, which now favours of your quasi-divine merits, now boldly competing with ancient centuries and all Antiquity.

Indeed, Poliziano considered his achievements to be more meritorious than those of Alexander the Great or Julius Caesar. He offered to write an epic work giving an account of John II accomplishments in navigation and conquests. The king replied in a positive manner in a letter of 23 October 1491, but delayed the commission.

In popular culture
 In the TV series Christopher Columbus (1985) he is played by Max von Sydow.
 In the film Christopher Columbus: The Discovery (1992) he is played by Mathieu Carrière.
 He appears in Civilization IV (as João II), leading the Portuguese.
 In the TV series Isabel played by Álvaro Monje

Marriage and descendants

Ancestry

Notes

References
 Bodian, Mirian Hebrews of the Portuguese Nation (1997)
 Boxer, Charles R. From Lisbon to Goa, 1500–1750 (1991)
 Boxer, Charles R. The Portuguese Seaborne Empire 1415–1825 (1969)
 Duffy, James Portuguese Africa (1968)
 Mira, Manuel S. Forgotten Portuguese: The Melungeons and the Portuguese Making of America (1998)
 Orange, G. V. "King John II of Portugal and the Quest for India."History Today (June 1968), Vol. 18 Issue 6, pp 415–421; online' covers 1451 to  1495.
 Page, Martin The First Global Village

External links
 D. John II (the perfect prince) 

1455 births
1495 deaths
15th-century Portuguese monarchs
House of Aviz
Knights of the Garter
Maritime history of Portugal
People from Lisbon
Portuguese infantes
Princes of Portugal
Portuguese exploration in the Age of Discovery